Tattarisuo (Finnish), Tattarmossen (Swedish) is a northeastern neighborhood of Helsinki, Finland, east of the Helsinki-Malmi airport. It has a population of 70 (in 2005), and contains 1084 jobs (December 2003). The neighbourhood consists mostly of small industry and warehouses. Many of the companies in the area deal with recycling metal.

The woods in the area is known for their bird life and are popular among birdwatchers in Helsinki.

Neighbourhoods of Helsinki